DU145 (DU-145) is a human prostate cancer cell line. DU145, PC3, and LNCaP are considered to be the standard prostate cancer cell lines used in therapeutic research.

The DU145 cell line was derived from a central nervous system metastasis, of primary prostate adenocarcinoma origin, removed during a parieto-occipital craniotomy. DU145 are not hormone-sensitive and do not express prostate-specific antigen (PSA). DU145 cells have moderate metastatic potential compared to PC3 cells, which have high metastatic potential. DU145 cells are androgen receptor positive.

References

External links
 Cellosaurus entry for DU145

Human cell lines
Cancer research
Urology
Prostate cancer